Cryptella is a genus of small-shelled slugs in the family Parmacellidae.

Species 
Species in the genus Cryptella include:
 Cryptella alegranzae Hutterer & Groh, 1991
 Cryptella auriculata (Mousson, 1872)
 Cryptella canariensis Webb & Berthelot, 1833 - synonym: Parmacella canariensis (Webb & Berthelot, 1833)
 Cryptella famarae Hutterer & Groh, 1991

References

External links 
  Webb P. B. & Berthelot S. (1844) Histoire naturelle des îles Canaries II, 2. Zoologie. page 50
 
 Photo of the shell

Parmacellidae